Joseph Rosemeyer (13 March 1872 in Lingen – 1 December 1919 in Cologne), was a German track cyclist. He competed at the 1896 Summer Olympics in Athens.

Rosemeyer finished fourth in the 10 kilometres event. He also competed in the time trial competition and finished eighth. In the sprint event he was unable to finish the race due to having mechanical problems. He also did not finish the 100 kilometres contest.

References

External links

1872 births
1919 deaths
German male cyclists
Olympic cyclists of Germany
Cyclists at the 1896 Summer Olympics
19th-century sportsmen
People from Lingen
Cyclists from Lower Saxony